Chakravyūha, also rendered Chakravyuha, Chakravyuham, Chakravyuh or Chakravuh, is another name for the Padmavyuha, an ancient circular battle formation, a circular trap.

These terms may also refer to:

 Chakravyuha (1978 film), Hindi film starring Rajesh Khanna
 Chakravyuha (1983 film), Kannada film
 Chakravyuh (2012 film), Hindi film
 Chakravyuha (2016 film), Kannada film by M. Saravanan
 Chakravyuh – An Inspector Virkar Crime Thriller, Hindi web series